Maoritenes is a genus of moths belonging to the subfamily Tortricinae of the family Tortricidae.

Species
Maoritenes cyclobathra (Meyrick, 1907)
Maoritenes modesta (Philpott, 1930)

See also
List of Tortricidae genera

References

External links
tortricidae.com

Schoenotenini